Grøndal station (previously called Godthåbsvej station) is an S-train station in Copenhagen, Denmark served by the ring line.

See also
 List of railway stations in Denmark

S-train (Copenhagen) stations
1934 establishments in Denmark
Railway stations in Denmark opened in the 20th century